Simone Pesce (born 10 July 1982) is an Italian footballer  who plays as a midfielder for Lumezzane.

Career

Latina
Pesce started his career off with small Italian club Latina in 1999. He remained at the club until 2005, making a nearly 130 league appearances for the club and scoring 6 goals.

Sassari Torres
After greatly impressing during his five season spell with Latina, he moved to Serie C side Sassari Torres. In one season with the club he impressed very much and was signed by then Serie A side Ascoli Calcio 1898 in 2006. With Sassari Torres, he scored 3 goals in just over 30 appearances.

Ascoli
Pesce moved to Serie A struggler Ascoli in 2006. He soon became an important player to the team. The club were also relegated in 2007. Ascoli never managed to threaten for a promotion place in 2008 and 2009, in which Pesce score 6 goals in a total of 69 Serie B appearances.
Pesce played 4 matches (2 in the Coppa Italia) in the 2009–10 season prior to his transfer to Catania.

Catania
On 31 August 2009, the final day of the transfer market, Calcio Catania announced the signings of Pesce from Ascoli in co-ownership deal for €500 and Giovanni Marchese from A.C. Chievo Verona.  Catania already negotiated with Ascoli earlier this summer purchasing Giuseppe Bellusci and also selling Vito Falconieri and Marcello Gazzola in co-ownership deals. Pesce failed to make a major impact with the Sicilian club, and failed solidify regular playing time as he made just five appearances, not scoring.

On 30 December 2009, Catania confirmed the transfer of Pesce back to Ascoli on a loan deal until the end of the season. In his six-month loan spell in the Serie B, Pesce quickly re-gained his starting position, and made 22 appearances, for the club.

He returned to Catania on 1 July 2010, and remained with the club for 2010-11 Serie A season. In June 2011 Ascoli bought back Pesce from Catania for €550. Ascoli also bought Gazzola outright for €500, and Falconieri for free.

Novara 
On 15 July 2011, Novara announced to have signed Pesce from Ascoli for their Serie A comeback campaign, for €150,000, in a three year-contract. Novara also signed Achille Coser on the same day for free, as well as Luigi Giorgi for €1.6 million on 16 July. On 7 August 2013 Pesce signed a new 4-year contract with Novara.

Cremonese 
In January 2016 he moved to Cremonese.

Lumezzane
On 28 July 2020 he signed with Lumezzane.

References

External links
 La Gazzetta dello Sport profile 
 Lega Serie A profile 
http://www.uscremonese.it/player/simone-pesce/ Pesce at Cremonese Official Website

1982 births
People from Latina, Lazio
Footballers from Lazio
Living people
Italian footballers
Association football midfielders
Latina Calcio 1932 players
Ascoli Calcio 1898 F.C. players
Catania S.S.D. players
Novara F.C. players
U.S. Cremonese players
FeralpiSalò players
F.C. Lumezzane V.G.Z. A.S.D. players
Serie A players
Serie B players
Serie C players
Serie D players
S.E.F. Torres 1903 players
Sportspeople from the Province of Latina